is a football stadium in Tosu, Saga, Japan. It serves as a home ground of J1 League club Sagan Tosu. The stadium holds 24,130 people and was built in 1996.

History
The stadium was built in the site of Tosu rail yard and Tosu classification yard in accord with the JR Kyushu's Tosu Station.

It was formerly known as  then it was called Best Amenity Stadium from January 2008 to January 2019 for the naming rights.

Access 
It is three minutes' walk from Tosu Station.

References

External links 
Best Amenity Stadium:J. League stadium guide 

Football venues in Japan
Rugby union stadiums in Japan
Sagan Tosu
Sports venues in Saga Prefecture
Sports venues completed in 1996
1996 establishments in Japan